Linas Kukuraitis (born 22 May 1978) is a Lithuanian politician. He served as Minister of Social Security and Labour in the Skvernelis Cabinet led by Prime Minister Saulius Skvernelis from 13 December 2016 to 11 December 2020.

In 2021, Kukuraitis left his former party, the Lithuanian Farmers and Greens Union, and joined On Behalf of Lithuania, a new party established by himself and Skvernelis.

References 

Living people
1978 births
Place of birth missing (living people)
21st-century Lithuanian politicians
Ministers of Social Security and Labour of Lithuania